Daniel Wallace (born 14 April 1993) is a retired Scottish swimmer who has represented Great Britain in the Olympic Games and FINA world championships, and Scotland in the Commonwealth Games.  The 2014 Commonwealth Games champion at 400 metre individual medley, he was part of the Great Britain 4 x 200 metre freestyle relay team that won gold at the 2015 FINA World Aquatics Championships, and silver at the same event at the 2016 Summer Olympics.

Career
Competing for Scotland at the 2014 Commonwealth Games held in Glasgow, Wallace won the gold medal in the men's 400-metre individual medley with a first-place time 4:11.28.  He also won a silver medal in the 200-metre individual medley and silver as a member of the second-place Scottish team in the 4x200-metre freestyle relay.

He was born in Edinburgh, and trained under head coach Laurel Bailey at Warrender Baths Club.  In 2011, Wallace won a silver medal for the 200-metre individual medley and a bronze for the 400-metre individual medley at the 2011 European Junior Swimming Championships in Belgrade, Serbia.

Wallace accepted an athletic scholarship to attend the University of Florida in Gainesville, Florida, United States, where he swam for coach Gregg Troy's Florida Gators swimming and diving team in National Collegiate Athletic Association (NCAA) and Southeastern Conference (SEC) competition from 2012 to 2015.  In his four seasons of college swimming, he was a member of the Gators' NCAA national championship relay team in the 4x200-yard freestyle relay as a sophomore in 2013, and was NCAA national runner-up in the 500-yard freestyle event in 2014 and 2015.  He was the recipient of twelve All-American honours.

At the 2015 World Aquatics Championships in Kazan, Russia, Wallace won a gold medal as a member of the first-place British team in the men's 4×200-metre freestyle relay.

On 11 April 2018, after winning two Bronze medals at the 2018 Commonwealth Games in Australia, Wallace announced his retirement from swimming at the age of 24. He said, "I'd done everything I wanted to do within the sport so it was just about enjoying the last moments, the last Games, and the last chance to represent Scotland."

See also
 List of Commonwealth Games medallists in swimming (men)

References

External links
 Dan Wallace – Scottish Swimming athlete profile

1993 births
Living people
Commonwealth Games gold medallists for Scotland
Florida Gators men's swimmers
Scottish male swimmers
Sportspeople from Edinburgh
World Aquatics Championships medalists in swimming
Commonwealth Games silver medallists for Scotland
Swimmers at the 2016 Summer Olympics
Swimmers at the 2014 Commonwealth Games
Olympic silver medallists for Great Britain
Medalists at the 2016 Summer Olympics
Olympic swimmers of Great Britain
Olympic silver medalists in swimming
Commonwealth Games medallists in swimming
Scottish Olympic medallists
Medallists at the 2014 Commonwealth Games
Medallists at the 2018 Commonwealth Games